The 2014–15 UEFA Champions League knockout phase began on 17 February and concluded on 6 June 2015 with the final at Olympiastadion in Berlin, Germany to decide the champions of the 2014–15 UEFA Champions League. A total of 16 teams competed in the knockout phase.

Times are CET/CEST, as listed by UEFA (local times are in parentheses).

Round and draw dates
All draws were held at UEFA headquarters in Nyon, Switzerland.

Format
The knockout phase involved the 16 teams which qualified as winners and runners-up of each of the eight groups in the group stage.

Each tie in the knockout phase, apart from the final, was played over two legs, with each team playing one leg at home. The team that scored more goals on aggregate over the two legs advanced to the next round. If the aggregate score was level, the away goals rule was applied, i.e. the team that scored more goals away from home over the two legs advanced. If away goals were also equal, then thirty minutes of extra time was played. The away goals rule was again applied after extra time, i.e. if there were goals scored during extra time and the aggregate score was still level, the visiting team advanced by virtue of more away goals scored. If no goals were scored during extra time, the tie was decided by penalty shoot-out. In the final, which was played as a single match, if scores were level at the end of normal time, extra time was played, followed by penalty shoot-out if scores remained tied.

The mechanism of the draws for each round was as follows:
In the draw for the round of 16, the eight group winners were seeded, and the eight group runners-up were unseeded. The seeded teams were drawn against the unseeded teams, with the seeded teams hosting the second leg. Teams from the same group or the same association could not be drawn against each other.
In the draws for the quarter-finals onwards, there were no seedings, and teams from the same group or the same association could be drawn against each other.

Qualified teams

Bracket

Round of 16
The draw was held on 15 December 2014. The first legs were played on 17, 18, 24 and 25 February, and the second legs were played on 10, 11, 17 and 18 March 2015.

Summary

Matches

3–3 on aggregate; Paris Saint-Germain won on away goals.

Barcelona won 3–1 on aggregate.

1–1 on aggregate; Atlético Madrid won on penalties.

Juventus won 5–1 on aggregate.

Real Madrid won 5–4 on aggregate.

Bayern Munich won 7–0 on aggregate.

3–3 on aggregate; Monaco won on away goals.

Porto won 5–1 on aggregate.

Quarter-finals
The draw was held on 20 March 2015. The first legs were played on 14 and 15 April, and the second legs were played on 21 and 22 April 2015.

Summary

Matches

Barcelona won 5–1 on aggregate.

Real Madrid won 1–0 on aggregate.

Bayern Munich won 7–4 on aggregate.

Juventus won 1–0 on aggregate.

Semi-finals
The draw was held on 24 April 2015. The first legs were played on 5 and 6 May, and the second legs were played on 12 and 13 May 2015.

Summary

Matches

Barcelona won 5–3 on aggregate.

Juventus won 3–2 on aggregate.

Final

The final was played on 6 June 2015 at the Olympiastadion in Berlin, Germany. The "home" team (for administrative purposes) was determined by an additional draw held after the semi-final draw.

Notes

References

External links
2014–15 UEFA Champions League

Knockout Phase
2014-15